The Cayman Islands have attended ten Commonwealth Games, beginning in 1978. They have won two medals during this time, a bronze from Kareem Streete-Thompson in the 2002 long jump and a gold by Cydonie Mothersille at the 2010 games for the 200 metres.

Medal tally

References

 

 
Nations at the Commonwealth Games